Jennifer 8 is a 1992 American thriller film written and directed by Bruce Robinson and starring Andy García, Uma Thurman, and John Malkovich.

Plot
Los Angeles detective John Berlin is teetering toward burnout after the collapse of his marriage. At the invitation of an old friend and colleague, Freddy Ross, Berlin heads to rural northern California, for a job with the Eureka police force. Berlin rankles his new colleagues, especially John Taylor, who was passed over for promotion to make room for Berlin.

After finding a woman's severed hand in a garbage bag at the local dump, Berlin reopens the case of an unidentified murdered girl, nicknamed "Jennifer", which went unsolved despite a full-time six-month effort by the department. Berlin notes an unusually large number of scars on the hand, as well as wear on the finger-tips, which he realizes came from reading Braille, determining that the girl is blind. He begins to believe the cases are related. Berlin does his best to convince Freddy and his fellow officers of his suspicions, but Taylor and police chief Citrine refuse to believe that the hand found at the dump is in any way connected to the other cases.

After consulting his former colleagues in Los Angeles, Berlin discovers that in the previous four years, six women, most of them blind, have either been found dead or are still missing, all within a 300-mile radius of San Diego. He becomes convinced that "Jennifer" was the 7th victim and the girl whose hand was found at the dump is "Jennifer 8", or victim #8. While investigating the links between the dead and missing blind girls, he meets blind music teacher Helena Robertson, determining that her roommate Amber was the eighth victim. Berlin becomes obsessed with the case, despite an almost complete lack of hard evidence, and becomes romantically involved with Helena, who resembles his ex-wife.

After an attack on Helena, Ross accompanies Berlin on a stakeout at the institute where Helena lives in a dorm, after leaving Helena with Ross' wife Margie. When they see a flashlight shining on the same floor as Helena's apartment, Berlin investigates and is knocked unconscious by the killer, who then shoots and kills Ross with Berlin's .32 pistol. A grueling interrogation of Berlin by FBI special agent St. Anne ensues. St. Anne makes clear to Berlin that he figures him for Ross's murderer, but also inadvertently reveals information which helps Berlin realize that Sgt. Taylor is the true killer. Berlin tells St. Anne and Citrine who he believes the killer to be, but his deductions are met with disbelief. Berlin is arrested for Ross's murder, but is bailed out by Margie, who does not believe that Berlin is the killer.

Upon making bail, Berlin returns to Margie's house only to learn that Margie has taken Helena back to the institute. Fearing that Helena and Margie are in danger, Berlin rushes to the institute, but fails to arrive ahead of Taylor, who breaks in and chases Helena through the dorm. Finally catching up to her, Taylor is shocked to discover that the woman he'd been pursuing is actually Margie. She  shoots Taylor dead, avenging her husband and closing the case.

Cast

Production
While establishing scenes were shot in Eureka and Trinidad, California, most filming took place in various municipalities of Greater Vancouver, British Columbia, including: Riverview Hospital in Coquitlam; Richmond for the rural London Heritage Farm and for the Marine Garage in Steveston; and, Maple Ridge for the dump and for "John Berlin's" farmhouse. The film's sets were designed by the art director Richard Macdonald.

Bruce Robinson later said that the film had been hurt by studio interference: "There were four different heads of studio on that movie, they all wanted different things. The worst thing happened before we made the movie and that was having Andy (García), great guy that he is, on the movie. I didn't write it for a handsome young lead, I wrote it for a shagged out old cop like Gene Hackman or Al Pacino (...) The problem is the moment you see Andy García and Uma Thurman on screen together you think, "That ain't bad. A couple of romantic leads, that's nice." The whole point was that he was this fucked guy; he was Rod Steiger if you like."

Reception

Critical response
 

In her review for The New York Times, Janet Maslin felt the two hour running time resulted in unnecessary details unimportant to the mystery, unhelpful as its "mystery eventually proves to be its weakest element."

Box office
 the film grossed $11.4 million at the box office in the United States and Canada.

References

External links

 
 

1992 films
1990s mystery thriller films
1990s psychological thriller films
1992 crime thriller films
1990s serial killer films
American mystery thriller films
American crime thriller films
American serial killer films
1990s English-language films
Films about blind people
Films directed by Bruce Robinson
Films scored by Christopher Young
Films produced by Gary Lucchesi
Films set in Los Angeles
Films set in Vancouver
Films shot in Los Angeles
Films shot in Vancouver
Paramount Pictures films
1990s American films